Jack Maguire may refer to:

 Jack Maguire (baseball) (1925–2001), American baseball player
 Jack Maguire (golfer) (born 1994), American professional golfer